Kim Burningham (September 14, 1936 - July 7, 2017) was a member of the Utah House of Representatives for 15 years (serving in the 43rd through the 50th Utah State Legislatures.  He also served on the Utah Board of Education for 16 years.  Burnigham was an alumnus of the University of Utah.

References

1936 births
2017 deaths
Members of the Utah House of Representatives
University of Utah alumni